Ricardo Duarttee is a South African rugby union player, playing with the South Africa national rugby sevens team.

International rugby career 
He debuted for the Blitzboks in 2022 at the Dubai tournament where his performances earned him the nickname of Tricky Ricky.

References

Living people
1998 births
Rugby union scrum-halves
South African rugby union players
South Africa international rugby sevens players
Boland Cavaliers players
Western Province (rugby union) players